Hope Bowdler is a civil parish in Shropshire, England.  It contains eleven listed buildings that are recorded in the National Heritage List for England.  All the listed buildings are designated at Grade II, the lowest of the three grades, which is applied to "buildings of national importance and special interest".  The parish contains the village of Hope Bowdler and the surrounding countryside.  Most of the listed buildings are memorials in the churchyard of St Andrew's Church, which is also listed.  The other listed buildings are a house in the village, and a farmhouse and outbuilding in the countryside to the south.


Buildings

References

Citations

Sources

Lists of buildings and structures in Shropshire